Olympic songs and anthems are adopted officially by International Olympic Committee (or by official broadcasters and partners selected by IOC), to be used prior to the Olympic Games and to accompany the games during the event.

They are used as theme music in TV broadcast and also used in advertising campaigns for the Olympic Games. Some songs and anthems are more popular and famous than official songs and anthems.

Summer Olympics

Official theme songs and anthems

Other songs and anthems

Winter Olympics

Official theme songs and anthems

Other songs and anthems

Albums 
  Summer Olympics

 Winter Olympics

See also 
 List of FIFA World Cup songs and anthems

References